Expeditie Robinson: 2004, was the fifth Dutch/Belgian version of the Swedish show Expedition Robinson, or Survivor as it is referred to in some countries. This season began airing on September 5, 2004 and concluded on November 28, 2004. The major twist this season was that the team tribes were divided up by participants country of origin with one tribe, België (Belgium), being composed of contestants from Belgium and one tribe, Nederlands (Netherlands), being composed of contestants from the Netherlands. Another major twist this season came to light in episode 1, when after an initial elimination challenge the two eliminated contestants, Erestine Schweig and Sarah Bleecker, were told that instead of being eliminated they were going to live in an area known as the "Mangrove". From then on, any contestant that either lost a challenge or voted out were sent to the Mangrove. Throughout the competition many contestants living in the Mangrove were given opportunities to re-enter the game, however it was not until episode 9, when the contestants living in the Mangrove won a challenge against the merge tribe, known as Teluk, in order to re-enter the game. Another twist that occurred this season was that of a tribal swap which took place in episode 4. Following the Mangrove contestants return to the game, a power struggle ensued between the Belgian and Dutch contestants. Ultimately, it was Belgian contestant Frank Meulder who won the season over fellow Belgian Matthias Verscheure with an overwhelming majority jury vote of 10-2. Like the previous season, the public was asked to vote in case of a tie. The public, like most of the jury, voted in favor of Frank.

Finishing order

Future Appearances
Ernestine Schweig, Mick Poelvaarde and Frank Meulder returned to compete in Expeditie Robinson: Battle of the Titans.

Voting history

 Due to Henk's ejection in episode 2, no one was eliminated following the vote at tribal council. However, as Frouke received the most votes she was given a penalty vote at the next tribal council.

 Due to Patrick's voluntary exit in episode 4, no one was eliminated following the vote at tribal council. However, as Jeroen received the most votes he would have been given a penalty vote at the next tribal council.

 Due to Jeroen's voluntary exit in episode 5, no one was eliminated following the vote at tribal council. However, as Mitchell received the most votes he was given a penalty vote at the next tribal council.

 At the ninth tribal council both Darline and Klaar received four votes. Because of this, the two were forced to draw lots to determine who would be eliminated.

 Like in previous years, the public was allowed to give one jury vote through the results of a poll. The public voted for Frank.

External links
http://worldofbigbrother.com/Survivor/BN/5/about.shtml
https://web.archive.org/web/20100824005703/http://www.expeditie-robinson.tv/vorigeseizoenen/expeditierobinson2004/

Expeditie Robinson seasons
2004 Dutch television seasons
2004 Belgian television seasons